The Legislative Assembly of Sergipe is the unicameral legislature of Sergipe state in Brazil. It has 24 state deputies elected by proportional representation.

The Province of Sergipe was consolidated on October 24, 1824. The first Provincial Assembly started in 1835; Cônego Antônio Fernandes da Silveira was the first president. On June 24, 2004, the TV Alese  was created.

References

External links
Official website

Sergipe
Sergipe
Sergipe